Felix of Nola, sometimes also called St. Felix martyr, (d. ca. 260) was a Christian presbyter at Nola near Naples in Italy. He sold off his possessions to give to the poor, but was arrested and tortured for his Christian faith during the persecution of Roman Emperor Decius (r. 249–51). He was believed to have died a martyr's death during the persecution of Decius or Valerian (ca. 253) but is now listed in the General Roman Calendar as a confessor of the faith, who survived his tortures.

Life

Felix was the elder son of Hermias, a Syrian centurion who had retired to Nola, Italy. After his father's death Felix sold off most of his property and possessions, gave the proceeds to the poor, and pursued a clerical vocation. Felix was ordained by, and worked with, Saint Maximus of Nola.

When bishop Maximus fled to the mountains to escape the persecution of the Roman emperor Decius, Felix was arrested and beaten for his faith instead. He escaped prison, according to legend being freed by an angel, so that he could help bishop Maximus. Felix found Maximus alone, ill, and helpless, and hid him from soldiers in a vacant building. When the two were safely inside, a spider quickly spun a web over the door, fooling the imperial forces into thinking it was long abandoned, and they left without finding the Christians. A subsequent attempt to arrest Felix followed, which he avoided by hiding in a ruined building where again spider web was spun across the entrance convinced the soldiers the building was abandoned. The two managed to hide from authorities until the persecution ended with the death of Emperor Decius in 251.

After Maximus's death, the people wanted Felix to be the next bishop of Nola, but he declined, favoring Quintus, a "senior" priest who had seven days more experience than Felix. Felix himself continued as a priest. He also continued to farm his remaining land, and gave most of the proceeds to people even poorer than himself.

Legend assigns to Felix a martyr's death either in the year 255 under Emperor Valerian (253–260) or, in another version, in the general persecution instigated by the Emperor Decius (249-251). According to Butler, Felix died in a good old age, on the fourteenth of January.

Much of the little information we have about Felix comes from the letters and poetry of Paulinus of Nola. When at length peace was obtained, he returned home and in poverty lived a withdrawn life until old age, an unconquered confessor of the faith.

Five churches have been built at, or near the place, where he was first interred, which was without the precincts of the city of Nola. His precious remains are kept in the cathedral; but certain portions are at Rome, Benevento, and some other places. In time a new church in Nola was dedicated in the name of St Felix. People travelled from far away to see the burial place of this revered saint. His relics lie in Nola Cathedral. He is the patron saint of lost animals and spiders.

References

Donald Attwater and Catherine Rachel John, "The Penguin Dictionary of Saints." 3rd edition, New York: Penguin Books, 1993, .

3rd-century births
250s deaths
People from Nola
Saints from Roman Italy
Italian Roman Catholic saints
Syrian Christian saints
3rd-century Romans
3rd-century Christian martyrs
Insects in religion